Helianthella, the little sunflower, is a genus of North American plants in the family Asteraceae.

 Species
 Helianthella californica A.Gray - California, Nevada, Oregon
 Helianthella castanea Greene - San Francisco Bay region
 Helianthella ciliata S.F.Blake - Chihuahua
 Helianthella durangensis B.L.Turner - Durango
 Helianthella gypsophila B.L.Turner - 	Nuevo León, Coahuila
 Helianthella mexicana A.Gray - San Luis Potosí, Zacatecas, etc.
 Helianthella microcephala (A.Gray) A.Gray - Arizona, New Mexico, Colorado, Utah
 Helianthella parryi A.Gray - Arizona, New Mexico, Colorado, Utah
 Helianthella quinquenervis (Hook.) A.Gray - from Coahuila to Oregon + Montana
 Helianthella uniflora (Nutt.) Torr. & A.Gray - from New Mexico to British Columbia

References

External links
 USDA Plants Profile
 

 
Asteraceae genera
Flora of North America